GlassBridge Enterprises, Inc., formerly Imation Corporation, is an American holding company. Through its subsidiary, Glassbridge focuses primarily on investment and asset management. Prior to the name change, Glassbridge had three core elements: traditional storage (magnetic tape and optical products), secure and scalable storage (data backup, data archive and data security for small and medium businesses) and what the company calls "audio and video information" products.

History 
Imation was started in 1996, when 3M spun off its data storage and imaging business. The company underwent a divestment of non-core businesses, and invested in four core product technology areas: secure storage, scalable storage, wireless/connectivity, and magnetic tape. As part of 3M, the company was involved in the development of many technological improvements in data storage, such as the introduction of the first American-made magnetic tape in 1947, the first quarter-inch tape cartridge for data storage (QIC) in 1971, and the  floppy disk in 1984.

In February 2012, Imation announced a product set to secure mobile data, identities, and workspaces, based on the idea that employees used portable storage devices to transport corporate data.

The security news followed five acquisitions the company made in 2011 in scalable storage and data security: ENCRYPTX; MXI Security from Memory Experts International; the assets of ProStor; the secure data storage hardware business of IronKey; and intellectual property from Nine Technologies. Imation received an exclusive license from IronKey for its secure storage management software and service and a license to use the IronKey brand for secure storage products.

In October 2011, Imation products for small and medium businesses centered on its DataGuard and InfiniVault multi-tier data protection and data archive appliances.

The company sold consumer electronics, headphones and accessories under the Imation, Memorex, TDK Life on Record, and XtremeMac brands. The combined Imation, Memorex and TDK Life on Record brands made the company into a global market share leader in sales of CD-R and DVD media before that business was shut down in 2016.

Imation changed its name to Glassbridge Enterprises on February 21, 2017. Net revenue for 2016 was $44.1 million, compared to $529.2 million the year before.

Glassbridge Enterprises sold the Imation brand name to Korean company O-Jin Corporation Co., Ltd. on August 4, 2017.

In 2019 Imation.com announced the brand's licence-use by PNY Technology, Ritek Corporation and photo printer company Prinics.

See also 
3M
Computer data storage
Memorex

References

External links 
Glassbridge Enterprises
O-Jin Corporation's Imation website
imation brand website

Financial services companies established in 1996
Companies based in Minnesota
Manufacturing companies based in Minnesota
Computer companies established in 1996
Companies formerly listed on the New York Stock Exchange
Companies traded over-the-counter in the United States
Computer storage companies
Computer memory companies
Electronics companies of the United States
Multinational companies
Investment companies of the United States
Investment management companies of the United States
Corporate spin-offs
3M